Guru Har Krishan (Gurmukhi: ਗੁਰੂ ਹਰਿ ਕ੍ਰਿਸ਼ਨ,; 7 July 1656 – 30 March 1664) was the eighth of the ten Sikh Gurus. At the age of five, he became the youngest Guru in Sikhism on 7 October 1661, succeeding his father, Guru Har Rai. He contracted smallpox in 1664 and died before reaching his eighth birthday. It is said that he died because he contracted smallpox while successfully curing his followers.

He is also known as Bal Guru (Child Guru), and sometimes spelled in Sikh literature as Hari Krishan Sahib. He is remembered in the Sikh tradition for saying "Baba Bakale" before he died, which Sikhs interpreted to identify his granduncle Guru Tegh Bahadur as the next successor. Guru Har Krishan had the shortest reign as Guru, lasting only two years, five months and 24 days.

Biography
Har Krishan was born in Kiratpur (Shivalik Hills) in northwest Indian subcontinent to Krishen Devi (Mata Sulakhni) and Guru Har Rai. His father, Guru Har Rai supported the moderate Sufi influenced Dara Shikoh instead of conservative Sunni influenced Aurangzeb as the two brothers entered into a war of succession to the Mughal Empire throne. After Aurangzeb won the succession war in 1658, he summoned Guru Har Rai in 1660 to explain his support for the executed Dara Shikoh. Guru Har Rai sent his elder son Ram Rai to represent him. Aurangzeb kept the 13 year old Ram Rai as hostage, questioned Ram Rai about a verse in the Adi Granth – the holy text of Sikhs. Aurangzeb claimed that it disparaged the Muslims. Ram Rai changed the verse to appease Aurangzeb instead of standing by the Sikh scripture, an act for which Guru Har Rai excommunicated his elder son, and nominated the younger Har Krishan to succeed as the next Guru of Sikhism.

Lesson in humility 
Sikh Gurus have been known to impart lessons in humility during their lifetimes. One such famous incident as noted by Macauliffe in Sikh Religion - Vol 4 is from the life of Guru Har Krishan. Once on the way to Delhi from Punjab, Guru Har Krishan was staying at Panjokhara, near present day Ambala. Gurudwara Panjokhra Sahib is situated at this place now. A very learned pandit by the name of Lal Chand, noting that the guru's name was similar to that of Lord Krishna, came visiting with the intent to test him on the knowledge of Bhagavad Gita by asking the meaning of a few shalokas. The guru, with the intention to cure him of his pride, said that Lal Chand did not need the guru for this task and that anyone could do that. On hearing this, Lal Chand brought a mute and ignorant water carrier named Chhajju. The guru placed his stick on Chhajju's head. Macauliffe writes "The Brahman and the water carrier accordingly began to discuss, and the water carrier gave such learned replies, that the Brahman stood in astonished silence before the Guru." He accordingly begged Har Krishan's pardon for his mistake and became the Guru's disciple.

Requested meeting with Aurangzeb 
Aurangzeb meanwhile rewarded Ram Rai, patronizing him with land grants in Dehra Dun region of the Himalayas. A few years after Guru Har Krishan assumed the role of Sikh leader, Aurangzeb summoned the young Guru to his court through Raja Jai Singh, with an apparent plan to replace him with his elder brother Ram Rai as the Sikh Guru. However, Har Krishan contracted smallpox when he arrived in Delhi and his meeting with Aurangzeb was cancelled. Some sources state that he outright refused to meet with the Mughal emperor as he had foretold that Aurangzeb would demand he perform miracles, which are forbidden to be displayed in Sikhism. On his deathbed, Har Krishan said, "Baba Bakale", and died in 1664. The Sikh religious organization interpreted those words to mean that the next Guru is to be found in Bakale village, which they identified as Guru Tegh Bahadur, the ninth Guru of Sikhism. This proclamation frustrated Aurangzeb, who was eager to have Ram Rai installed as the next Sikh Guru so that he could control the community.

Visiting Raja Jai Singh and death 

One of the most famous Gurdwara of Sikhs in North India, Gurdwara Bangla Sahib was at that time the residence (bangla is an Indic term for bungalow) of Raja Jai Singh of Delhi. Raja Jai Singh humbly requested the Guru to come to Delhi, so that he and the Guru’s Sikhs may behold him.

Because of the Guru’s young age, the Raja’s wife too wanted to test his spiritual powers. Disguising herself as a maid, she sat amongst the lady attendants. However, the Guru instantly identified her and sat on her lap, proclaiming, “This is the Rani”, thereby convincing her of his spiritual powers.

It was during his stay here that a deadly disease of smallpox and cholera had spread in the city of Delhi. When people learned of Guru Har Krishan's presence there, they went to him for shelter and protection. Guru Har Krishan asked them to bathe in the well in the Bungalow to cure themselves. Anyone who took a bath there recovered.

Historiography 
Authentic literature with more details about Guru Har Krishan's life and times are scarce and not well recorded. Some of biographies about Guru Har Krishan, particularly about who his mother was, were written in the 18th century such as by Kesar Singh Chhibber, as well as in the 19th century, and these are highly inconsistent.

Gallery

See also 
 Gurudwara Bangla Sahib

References

External links

Sikhs.org
Sikh-History.com

Har Krishan
Deaths from smallpox
1656 births
1664 deaths
Punjabi people
1661 in India
Child deaths